Hobble Creek may refer to a location in the U.S. state of Utah:

 Hobble Creek (Utah County, Utah), a tributary of Utah Lake
 Hobble Creek, Utah, a census-designated place named for the creek
 Hobble Creek, original name of Springville, Utah

See also
 Hubble Creek (disambiguation)